Psychotria abdita is a  plant species in the family Rubiaceae and the genus Psychotria. The species is endemic to Peru, and the species was identified by Paul Carpenter Standley in 1929.

References

Flora of Peru
Plants described in 1929
abdita